Terence Patrick Winch is an Irish-American poet, writer, and musician.

Biography
Winch was born in New York City in November 1945.  He grew up in an Irish neighborhood in the Bronx, the child of Irish immigrants. In 1971, he moved to Washington, D.C., where he became involved with the Mass Transit readings in Dupont Circle. He published the first issue of Mass Transit magazine and co-founded Some of Us Press with Michael Lally and others.  His writing, which shows New York School and other influences, has been widely published and anthologized.  Primarily a poet, he has published fiction and non-fiction as well.  He was the subject of a profile on National Public Radio's All Things Considered in 1986, and has been featured a number of times on The Writer's Almanac radio program.  From 1975 to 1981, he was a regular book reviewer for The Washington Post and has also been a contributor to The Village Voice, The Washingtonian, The Dictionary of Irish Literature, The Oxford Companion to American Poetry, and other publications. Winch worked for the Smithsonian Institution for 24 years, for most of that time as Head of Publications at the National Museum of the American Indian.

Terence Winch has also played Irish traditional music from childhood, and co-founded the band Celtic Thunder in 1977, writing much of the band's material for its three albums.  His best-known composition is "When New York Was Irish," which has been covered by many other artists.

Writing
Winch has published nine books of poems and two story collections:
 That Ship Has Sailed (University of Pittsburgh Press, 2023)
 The Known Universe (Hanging Loose Press, 2018)
 This Way Out (Hanging Loose Press, 2014)
 Lit from Below (Salmon Poetry [Ireland], 2013)
 Falling Out of Bed in a Room with No Floor (Hanging Loose Press, 2011)
 Boy Drinkers (Hanging Loose Press, 2007)
 Irish Musicians/American Friends (Coffee House Press, 1985), American Book Award winner
 The Great Indoors (Story Line Press, 1995), Columbia Book Award winner
 The Drift of Things (The Figures, 2001)
 That Special Place (Hanging Loose, 2004), non-fiction stories
 Contenders (Story Line, 1989), short stories

Music
As performer, composer:
 This Day Too: Music from Irish America with Terence Winch, Michael Winch, and Jesse Winch (Celtic Thunder Music/Free Dirt Records, 2017), a CD of original and traditional compositions.
 When New York Was Irish: Songs & Tunes by Terence Winch (Celtic Thunder Music, 2007), a CD anthology of compositions by Winch
 Three albums with Celtic Thunder, a traditional Irish group, featuring original music by Winch:
 Celtic Thunder (Green Linnet, 1981)
 The Light of Other Days (Green Linnet, 1989)
 Hard New York Days (Kells, 1995).

As producer:
 Creation's Journey: Native American Music (Smithsonian/Folkways 1994)
 Wood That Sings: Indian Fiddle Music of the Americas (Smithsonian/Folkways, 1998)
 Beautiful Beyond: Christian Songs in Native Languages (Smithsonian/Folkways, 2004)
 Pulling Down the Clouds: Contemporary Native Writers Read Their Work (Smithsonian/NMAI, 2007)
 Sounds of Indian Summer: Contemporary Native Music (Smithsonian/NMAI, 2008)

References

External links
 Official website: http://www.terencewinch.com
 Poems by Terence Winch: http://www.poemhunter.com/terence-winch/
 Three, more recent poems in Serving House Journal, Spring 2013

American male poets
1945 births
Living people
20th-century American poets
American Book Award winners
20th-century American male writers